Zotta is a surname. Notable people with the surname include:

Mario Zotta (1904–1963), Italian politician
Ovidiu Zotta (1935–1996), Romanian writer, editor, and comic strip designer
Sever Zotta (1874–1943), Romanian archivist, genealogist, historian, and publicist